Daniel Patrick Enos (born July 1, 1968) is an American football coach and former player who is currently the offensive coordinator and quarterbacks coach at the University of Arkansas. He was previously the offensive coordinator and quarterbacks coach at the University of Miami. Enos served as head football coach at Central Michigan University from 2010 to 2014. He was also running backs coach at  Michigan State University, where he played as a quarterback from 1987 to 1990.

Playing career
Enos attended Edsel Ford High School in Dearborn, Michigan. He played quarterback and earned all-state honors while passing for 46 touchdowns and compiling 5,743 yards of total offense. Enos played four years at Michigan State University (1987–1990), including two as starting quarterback (1989–1990). Under Enos and then coach George Perles Michigan State won the 1989 Aloha Bowl and 1990 John Hancock Bowl and took a share of the 1990 Big Ten championship.  Enos has the third-best all-time pass completion percentage in Spartan history (.621) and eighth-best total yards (4,301). In 1991 Enos graduated from Michigan State with a degree in business administration.

Coaching career

Michigan State
After graduation Enos joined the Michigan State football coaching staff as a graduate assistant, staying there from 1991 to 1993.

Lakeland
In 1994 Enos joined the coaching staff at Lakeland College, a Division III school in Plymouth, Wisconsin. As offensive coordinator, Enos helped develop Mark Novara, Lakeland's most successful quarterback. After Novara entered the Lakeland Athletic Hall of Fame in 2008, he credited Enos for much of his success: "That was Coach Enos' first stint on a coaching staff. He was really young, but really good. We knew he'd be in the Big Ten some day."

Northern Michigan
After two years at Lakeland, Enos moved on to Division II Northern Michigan University, where he spent a year as offensive coordinator.

Southern Illinois
Enos then spent two years at Southern Illinois as quarterback and wide-receiver coach.

Missouri State
In 1999, Enos was announced to his first Division I offensive coordinator position at Missouri State in 1999 under then-head coach Randy Ball.

Western Michigan
Enos then moved to be quarterbacks coach at Western Michigan for three seasons.

North Dakota State
In 2003, Enos was hired as the offensive coordinator at Division I-FCS North Dakota State University.

Cincinnati
He then spent two seasons as quarterbacks coach for Cincinnati before returning again to his alma mater of Michigan State, spending four seasons there split between being quarterbacks and running backs coach.

Central Michigan
On January 12, 2010, Enos was introduced as the head coach at Central Michigan University, replacing Butch Jones, who left after three seasons to replace Brian Kelly at the University of Cincinnati.

Enos's teams struggled in his first two seasons at CMU. Enos produced back-to-back 3-9 seasons in 2010 and 2011. Despite the 6-18 record over two seasons, Enos was rewarded with a one-year contract extension in February 2012, extending his deal through the 2015 season.

Despite a 2–1 start in 2012 and an upset victory on the road over the University of Iowa, CMU again struggled under Enos, suffering a four-game losing streak after the upset in Iowa City. CMU suffered a 42–31 loss to rival Western Michigan University which saw CMU get outscored 28-8 in the 4th quarter. The loss was CMU's second straight to Western and CMU's record stood at 3-6. The following Wednesday, Central Michigan Life, published an editorial calling for Enos to be fired.

After the Western loss, Enos led CMU to a four-game winning streak and a victory over Western Kentucky in the 2012 Little Caesars Pizza Bowl, CMU's first bowl appearance and win since the 2010 GMAC Bowl. The 4-game winning streak gave CMU a record of 7–6, its first winning record since the 2009 season, the last season under Butch Jones and with Dan LeFevour as starting quarterback.

Enos was again rewarded with a one-year contract extension and pay raise in January 2013, extending his deal through the 2016 season.

On January 22, 2015, he resigned to take the offensive coordinator position at Arkansas.

Arkansas
After resigning his head coaching position at Central Michigan, Enos spent three seasons from 2015 to 2017 as offensive coordinator and quarterbacks coach for Arkansas under then-head coach Bret Bielema. His time as offensive coordinator was highlighted by an 8–5 record and Liberty Bowl win in his first season as offensive coordinator in 2015, the best overall record that Bielema had during his tenure as head coach. Bielema was fired from his position as Arkansas head coach after the 2017 season and new Arkansas head coach Chad Morris chose not to retain Enos, instead opting to bring in his own staff.

His offense in 2015 averaged 6.83 yards per play and had a completion percentage of .658. During the 2015 and 2016 season, Arkansas was one of two teams that featured a 3,000 yard passer and a 1,300 yard rusher. Both of those seasons included a different quarterback and different running back. Enos also coached Hunter Henry in 2015 who won the John Mackey Award as the nation's best tight end. In 2016, Arkansas was tied for second for the most offensive players drafted (5).

Michigan
Enos joined the Michigan staff as an offensive assistant in January 2018. He only stayed for about 6 weeks before leaving.

Alabama
Enos then joined Alabama for the 2018 season as quarterbacks coach under head coach Nick Saban as they finished the season with a perfect 13–0 record and a berth in the Orange Bowl as a part of the 2019 College Football Playoff National Championship. Enos was widely credited with Alabama quarterback Tua Tagovailoa's high completion percentage and passer efficiency rating for the 2018 season.

Miami
After the season Enos left Alabama and was hired as the offensive coordinator and quarterbacks coach at Miami under head coach Manny Diaz. On December 26, 2019, after a 14–0 shutout loss to Louisiana Tech in the Independence Bowl, Miami parted ways with Enos.

Maryland
On January 11, 2021, Enos was hired as the offensive coordinator and quarterbacks coach at the University of Maryland under head coach Mike Locksley, replacing Scottie Montgomery, who departed to become the running backs coach for the Indianapolis Colts.

Enos’ first season at Maryland brought a record setting passing offense to College Park. Taulia Tagovailoa threw for 3,860 passing yards and tied the school record with 26 passing touchdowns. He finished the season with a 69.2% completion percentage and seven games throwing for more than 300 yards. The 2021 season was the first bowl game for Maryland since 2016. Maryland traveled to New York to play Virginia Tech and it was another record setting performance for the Maryland offense. The offense set a school record for most points in a bowl game (54) which was also the most by a Power 5 team in the 2021 bowl season. In January 2023, Enos resigned to accept the Offensive Coordinator position at Arkansas.

Return to Arkansas
On January 19, 2023, Enos was hired by Sam Pittman to replace Kendal Briles as offensive coordinator less than 24 hours after Briles left for TCU. In fact, Enos was announced as Arkansas' new coordinator before TCU could make the same announcement for Briles. Pittman and Enos had previously coached together at Arkansas during the 2015 season under then-head coach Bret Bielema when Enos was in his first year as the Razorbacks OC and Pittman was in his last year as the offensive line coach.

Head coaching record

References

External links
 Arkansas profile
 Maryland profile
 Alabama profile

1968 births
Living people
American football quarterbacks
Alabama Crimson Tide football coaches
Arkansas Razorbacks football coaches
Central Michigan Chippewas football coaches
Cincinnati Bearcats football coaches
Lakeland Muskies football coaches
Maryland Terrapins football coaches
Miami Hurricanes football coaches
Michigan State Spartans football players
Michigan State Spartans football coaches
Missouri State Bears football coaches
North Dakota State Bison football coaches
Northern Michigan Wildcats football coaches
Southern Illinois Salukis football coaches
Western Michigan Broncos football coaches
Edsel Ford High School alumni
Sportspeople from Dearborn, Michigan
Coaches of American football from Michigan
Players of American football from Michigan